Mario Booysen (born 15 August 1988) is a South African professional soccer player who last played as a defender for Amazulu in the South African Premier Division.

International career
Booysen was selected in the South Africa senior team preliminary squad for the 2016 CHAN qualifier against Angola on 17 October 2015.

Personal life
His younger brother David Booysen is also a footballer.

References

External links

1988 births
Living people
South African soccer players
South Africa international soccer players
Cape Coloureds
Association football defenders
Sportspeople from Cape Town
South African Premier Division players
Cape Town Spurs F.C. players
Bloemfontein Celtic F.C. players
Maritzburg United F.C. players
SuperSport United F.C. players
Mamelodi Sundowns F.C. players
Kaizer Chiefs F.C. players
AmaZulu F.C. players